Senator Frederickson may refer to:

David Frederickson (born 1944), Minnesota State Senate
Dennis Frederickson (born 1939), Minnesota State Senate